Awe is an unincorporated community in  Lewis County, Kentucky, United States. The Awe post office  is closed.

References

Unincorporated communities in Lewis County, Kentucky
Unincorporated communities in Kentucky